Matthew McDonough (born March 12, 1969) is an American drummer best known as a member of the heavy metal band Mudvayne. He is the band's original drummer and has appeared and performed on every release by Mudvayne. He was also the original drummer of Audiotopsy since 2015 until his departure in 2021. He holds a respected place in the world of drumming for his signature drumming style.

Early life 
McDonough was born in Rockford, Illinois, he attended Rockford East High School and was a member of the Phantom Regiment Drum and Bugle Corps. He was previously in a band called On the Shoulders of Giants; as well as a band called Daed Kcis.

He also lived in Washington, IL and went to Washington Community High School.

Career

Mudvayne 
Within Mudvayne, McDonough was said to be the most influential person in setting the direction for the concept themes on the band's first two albums. He is also known for composing, recording, mixing, and mastering the electronic interludes on both L.D. 50 (2000) and The End of All Things to Come (2002). Mudvayne, who were enjoying immense popularity, released three more albums—Lost and Found (2005), The New Game (2008) and Mudvayne (2009)—before going on an indefinite hiatus in 2010. They announced their reunion in April 2021.

Audiotopsy 
In 2015, McDonough formed the band Audiotopsy with former Skrape lead vocalist Billy Keeton, former Mudvayne lead guitarist Greg Tribbett, and bassist Perry Stern. They released their debut studio album Natural Causes on October 2, 2015. In 2021, he and guitarist Greg Tribbett left Audiotopsy due to the reformation of Mudvayne.

Other projects 
For his solo work, in 2008 McDonough released his first album under the alias "MjDawn" with his cousin David W. McDonough, called Frequency Response. On the album, he experiments with acoustic drumming and electronica. McDonough, as MjDawn, also has several side projects both with ambient/electronica artist Vir Unis under the band name MiKroNaught and with guitarist RFSans under the band name ultrAtheist.

On the production side of the music industry, he is co-owner of the label AtmoWorks together with Vir Unis.

Equipment 
McDonough uses Pearl drums, Alchemy cymbals, Easton Ahead Signature drum sticks, Easton Ahead drum gloves and Evans drum heads. His Pearl Masterworks kit with custom tobacco fade finish and custom satin chrome hardware includes:
 20x16 bass drum
 13x8 custom snare drum
 8x7 tom (suspended directly on top of his 10x8 tom)
 10x8 tom
 12x9 tom
 14x10 tom
 16x16 suspended floor tom
 18x16 suspended floor tom (to his left)

Discography

Mudvayne 

Studio albums
 L.D. 50 (2000)
 The End of All Things to Come (2002)
 Lost and Found (2005)
 The New Game (2008)
 Mudvayne (2009)

Compilation Albums
 By the People, for the People (2007)
 Playlist: The Very Best of Mudvayne (2011)

EPs
 Kill, I Oughtta (1997)
 The Beginning of All Things to End (2001)
 Live Bootleg (2003)

Audiotopsy 
Studio albums
 Natural Causes (2015)
 The Real Now (2018)

References 

1969 births
Living people
Mudvayne members
Musicians from Peoria, Illinois
American heavy metal drummers
Progressive metal musicians
Nu metal drummers
20th-century American drummers
American male drummers